Tebenna carduiella is a moth of the family Choreutidae. It is found in the United States from New Jersey to Florida and west to Texas.

The wingspan is about 13 mm.

The larvae feed on Cirsium species. They bore the stems of their host plant.

References

External links
mothphotographersgroup

Tebenna
Moths described in 1902